Let Me Make You a Martyr is a 2016 American action crime drama film written, directed and co-produced by Corey Asraf and John Swab, and starring Marilyn Manson, Mark Boone Junior, Niko Nicotera, Michael Potts, Sam Quartin, Slaine and Danny Boy.

Synopsis
Drew Glass (Niko Nicotera) has recently returned to his hometown after years away, crossing paths with his adoptive father, local crime boss Larry Glass (Mark Boone Junior), and reconnecting with his adopted sister and love interest, June Glass (Sam Quartin). Determined to run away together and escape their complicated past, June and Drew concoct a plan to kill Larry. Unfortunately, Larry finds out about the scheme and hires a hit man of his own (Manson) to resolve the problem.

Cast

Marilyn Manson as Pope
Niko Nicotera as Drew Glass
Mark Boone Junior as Larry Glass
Sam Quartin as June Glass
Michael Potts as Charon
William Lee Scott as Jamie
George Carroll as Hondo
Michael Shamus Wiles as Father Francis
Rebekah Kennedy as Libby
Jake Silbermann as Lamen
Daniel Martin Berkey as Uncle Marvin
Gore Abrams as Brown
John Swab as Leroy
Gracie Grenier as Rooney
Magen Mattox as Seven
Bruce Davis as Ronin
Michael Jefferson as Lonnie
Edrick Browne as Darnell
Rat King as Chastity
Lisa Catara as Trisha Shelton
Debbi Tucker as Sister Mary Margaret
Daniel O’Connor as Willie
Brett Swab as Chett Larry
Mc Scab as Gardener

References

External links

2016 films
2016 crime action films
2016 action drama films
American crime action films
2016 directorial debut films
2010s English-language films
2010s American films